HD 185435 is a star in the constellation Cygnus. Its apparent magnitude is 6.42.

References

Cygnus (constellation)
K-type giants
Durchmusterung objects
185435
096546